Fridleif (Ynglinga saga) was a son of Fróði of the Skjöldung (Scylding) lineage. In that work he was the brother of Halfdan and the father of Áli the Strong.

References

Sources

Mythological kings of Denmark